Cosmopterix splendens is a moth in the family Cosmopterigidae. It is found in Russia.

References

Natural History Museum Lepidoptera generic names catalog

splendens